Tritia turulosa is a species of sea snail, a marine gastropod mollusk in the family Nassariidae, the nassa mud snails or dog whelks.

Description
The shell grows to a length of 9 mm.

Distribution
This species occurs in the Mediterranean Sea off Greece.

References

 Cernohorsky W. O. (1984). Systematics of the family Nassariidae (Mollusca: Gastropoda). Bulletin of the Auckland Institute and Museum 14: 1–356.
 Gofas, S.; Le Renard, J.; Bouchet, P. (2001). Mollusca, in: Costello, M.J. et al. (Ed.) (2001). European register of marine species: a check-list of the marine species in Europe and a bibliography of guides to their identification. Collection Patrimoines Naturels, 50: pp. 180–213

External links
 Risso, A. (1826-1827). Histoire naturelle des principales productions de l'Europe Méridionale et particulièrement de celles des environs de Nice et des Alpes Maritimes. Paris, F.G. Levrault. 3(XVI): 1-480, 14 pls
 Fischer, P. (1882-1883). Diagnoses d'espèces nouvelles de mollusques recueillis dans le cours des expéditions scientifiques de l'aviso "Le Travailleur" (1880 et 1881). Journal de Conchyliologie. 30: 49-53 (1882), 273-277
  Crocetta, F.; Bitar, G.; Zibrowius, H.; Oliverio, M. (2020). Increase in knowledge of the marine gastropod fauna of Lebanon since the 19th century. Bulletin of Marine Science. 96(1): 1-22.
 

Nassariidae
Molluscs of the Mediterranean Sea
Gastropods described in 1826
Taxa named by Antoine Risso